Gattyana cirrhosa is a scale worm known from widespread locations in the North Atlantic, Arctic, and northwestern Pacific oceans, from the intertidal zone to depths of at least .

Description
Gattyana cirrhosa is a short-bodied worm with 38 segments and 15 pairs of elytra, which bear a marginal fringe of papillae and are a rich brassy-orange colour. The lateral antennae are positioned ventrally on the prostomium, directly beneath the median antenna. Notochaetae are about as thick as or thinner than the  neurochaetae.

Biology and ecology

Gattyana cirrhosa has a commensal relationship with chaetopterid, terebellid, and pectinariid polychaete worms, living within the tubes they construct. However, it is also a free-living taxon.

References

Phyllodocida